RSN Stadium is a football stadium in Phnom Penh, Cambodia, and the home of Cambodian League club Phnom Penh Crown. The all-seater RSN Stadium is named after the club owner, Rithy Samnang. The stadium was opened with the RSN Youth Cup in June 2015 with a 4-team international tournament including Malaysia's Frenz United and Chonburi and Muangthong United from Thailand. All proceeds from the tournament were given to the Kantha Bopha Children's Hospital.

References

Football venues in Cambodia
Sports venues completed in 2015
Buildings and structures in Phnom Penh
Tourist attractions in Phnom Penh
2015 establishments in Cambodia
Phnom Penh Crown FC